Scott Donald Gray (born 25 February 1978) in Salisbury, Rhodesia (now Harare, Zimbabwe) is a retired rugby union footballer. Gray played as a flanker.

Gray was schooled at Peterhouse Boys, an independent school in Mashonaland East, Zimbabwe. He was head of Paget House and a school prefect. Gray moved to Australia aged 18. After spending two years in Canberra with the Brumbies academy he won a development contract with a view to playing in the Super 12.

However, Gray chose to switch codes and enjoyed a spell playing rugby league with Brisbane Broncos before joining Bath in the Guinness Premiership. From Bath Gray joined Border Reivers, playing for the side until they were disbanded by the Scottish Rugby Union.

Gray then joined English National Division One side Doncaster Knights before stepping up into the Premiership again with Northampton at the start of the 2008–09 season.

He won his first Scotland cap against Australia at Murrayfield in 2004, but would have to wait four years for his second chance on the international stage when, rejuvenated by his move to Northampton, he was called into Frank Hadden's squad for the autumn internationals. At the beginning of the 2009–10 season Gray had 8 caps for Scotland.

He intends to return to his former school and take up waterpolo and rugby coaching in 2011. This comes after a long-term injury that has halted his career with Scotland.

References 

1978 births
Living people
Alumni of Peterhouse Boys' School
Doncaster R.F.C. players
Northampton Saints players
Rugby union flankers
Scotland international rugby union players
Scottish rugby union players
Sportspeople from Harare
White Zimbabwean sportspeople
Zimbabwean emigrants to Australia
Zimbabwean people of British descent
Zimbabwean rugby league players
Zimbabwean rugby union players